Sons of Alpha Centauri (also known as Demo 2004) is the eponymous demo album by English instrumental rock band Sons of Alpha Centauri. Published on 11 November 2004, only 13 copies of the album were released in a hand-crafted slipcase. The album's artwork was designed by Seldon Hunt.

Sons of Alpha Centauri recorded two tracks for the demo in October 2004, stating that they were recorded on 10 microphones and then bounced down to a stereo mix via MiniDisc. The tracks were recorded at The Yacht Club in Sheerness, on the Isle of Sheppey in Kent.

Track listing

Personnel
 Blake – sound manipulation
 Stevie B. – drums
 Nick Hannon – bass guitar
 Marlon King – electric guitar

References

2004 albums
Demo albums
Sons of Alpha Centauri albums